Albert Helgerud (16 September 1876 – 25 May 1954) was a Norwegian rifle shooter who competed in the early 20th century. He won six Olympic medals including two golds.

References

1876 births
1954 deaths
Norwegian male sport shooters
ISSF rifle shooters
Olympic gold medalists for Norway
Olympic silver medalists for Norway
Olympic bronze medalists for Norway
Olympic shooters of Norway
Shooters at the 1906 Intercalated Games
Shooters at the 1908 Summer Olympics
Shooters at the 1912 Summer Olympics
Shooters at the 1920 Summer Olympics
Olympic medalists in shooting
Medalists at the 1906 Intercalated Games
Medalists at the 1908 Summer Olympics
Medalists at the 1912 Summer Olympics
Medalists at the 1920 Summer Olympics